The 2013 Notre Dame Fighting Irish men's soccer team represented the University of Notre Dame during the 2013 NCAA Division I men's soccer season. It was the 37th season of the university fielding a program. The Irish were coached by 13th-year head coach Bobby Clark and sixth year assistant coach, B. J. Craig, who was promoted to associate head coach prior to the season's start. Additionally, the coaching staff consisted of second year assistant coach, Greg Dalby.

The 2013 season was the Irish's first year winning an NCAA title. The Irish finished the season with 17–1–6 record, and defeated Wisconsin, Wake Forest, Michigan State, New Mexico and Maryland en route to the championship. Additionally, the Irish won the ACC regular season with a 7–1–3 record.

Roster 

The following players were members of the 2013 Notre Dame team.

Schedule 

Source:

|-
!colspan=6 style=""| Regular season
|-

|-
!colspan=6 style=""| ACC Tournament
|-

|-
!colspan=6 style=""| NCAA Tournament
|-

MLS Draft 
The following members of the 2013 Notre Dame Fighting Irish men's soccer team were selected in the 2014 MLS SuperDraft.

References

External links 
2013 Season Statistics 
Notre Dame Soccer National Championship Commemorative Guide

Notre Dame Fighting Irish
Notre Dame Fighting Irish men's soccer seasons
Notre Dame Fighting Irish, Soccer
Notre Dame Fighting Irish
NCAA Division I Men's Soccer Tournament College Cup seasons
NCAA Division I Men's Soccer Tournament-winning seasons
Notre Dame Fighting Irish